Filipe Mascarenhas was the 9th & 15th Governor of Portuguese Ceylon. Mascarenhas was first appointed in 1630 under Philip III of Portugal, he was Governor until 1631 and then in 1640 until 1645. He was succeeded by Jorge de Almeida and Manuel Mascarenhas Homem respectively.

References

Governors of Portuguese Ceylon
16th-century Portuguese people
1580 births
Year of death unknown
17th-century Portuguese people
Viceroys of Portuguese India